St. Andrew's Church in Whitminster, Gloucestershire is a village church constructed from Cotswold stone. 

The church site dates from 1086, although no part of the surviving fabric is visibly older than the 14th century. It was enlarged in 1842 to include a north aisle, designed by Bristol architect Thomas Foster, the tower was restored in 1844 and various other areas in 1884 by Sir A.W. Blomfeld, with the externals remaining mostly unchanged from that date. It currently has a peel of 6 bells, the earliest of which dates from 1634. It is one of only a few churches in Gloucestershire to retain a traditional Stoup, a stone basin used to hold Holy Water. The OS Bench Mark on the tower puts the base at 12.7 metres above mean sea level.

The parish is part of the Stroudwater Team benefice within the Diocese of Gloucester.

References

Whitminster
Whitminster
Grade II* listed churches in Gloucestershire